Ba Yan (巴燕, Pinyin: Bā Yàn; born 18 December 1962) is a Chinese former basketball player who competed in the 1984 Summer Olympics.

References

1962 births
Living people
Basketball players from Liaoning
Olympic basketball players of China
Basketball players at the 1984 Summer Olympics
Olympic bronze medalists for China
Olympic medalists in basketball
Chinese women's basketball players
Medalists at the 1984 Summer Olympics